Udea institalis is a species of moth in the family Crambidae. It is found in Spain, France, Italy, Greece, the Republic of Macedonia, Romania, Slovakia, Ukraine and Russia.

The larvae feed on Eryngium campestre.

References

Moths described in 1819
institalis
Moths of Europe
Moths of Asia